Royal Plaza Hotel is a five-star hotel on Prince Edward Road West, Mong Kok, Kowloon, Hong Kong that opened in 1997. In 2018, the hotel celebrated its 20th anniversary.

Owned by Sun Hung Kai Properties, it is located next to Grand Century Place and above the Mong Kok East station of the MTR.

History
At the end of 1990, the Kowloon-Canton Railway Corporation entered a joint venture with Sun Hung Kai Properties to develop the site. A land premium of around HK$2.5 billion was accordingly paid to the government in 1993.

The development, called Grand Century Place, was designed by Hong Kong architecture firm Wong & Ouyang. The hotel component, named Royal Plaza Hotel, opened in 1997.

Features
The hotel has two restaurants, a bar that hosts musicians, hot tubs, an outside pool, a gym, a health club, hot tubs, and a sauna. It also has a ballroom and meeting rooms.

Connecting to the hotel is a shopping mall named MOKO at Grand Century Place with clothing stores (including a Calvin Klein), restaurants (including an Outback Steakhouse), a food court, and a movie theater. Connecting to MOKO and the hotel is the Mong Kok East station of the MTR.

Reviews
The hotel was recommended by the Michelin Guide's "Michelin Guide Hong Kong Macau" as a "high-grade cozy" hotel five consecutive times between 2009 and 2013. It received Wedding Magazines "best venue (hotel) for star wedding banquet" listing for five consecutive years. In his 2013 book The Book of Perfect Wedding Preparation, wedding planner Tim Lau said Royal Plaza Hotel would be a good choice for a wedding venue. He observed that the staff were very attentive, the venue offered different food options for Chinese-style and Western-style weddings, and it was conveniently located near the MTR station. The Times of India reviewer Resham Sengar called the hotel "a cosy place in the heart of the city" that "has a reputation for rendering satisfactory service to its visitors".

See also 
 Royal Park Hotel (Sha Tin)

References

External links
 

 Multilingual (22 languages) unofficial informative website of Royal Plaza Hotel.

Hotel buildings completed in 1997
Hotels in Hong Kong
Mong Kok
Sun Hung Kai Properties
1997 establishments in Hong Kong